was a district located in Ishikawa Prefecture, Japan.

As of 2003, the district had an estimated population of 7,332 and a density of 136.21 persons per km2. The total area was 53.83 km2.

Towns and villages
Before the Hōsu District merger, the district had one town:

 Uchiura

History

Recent mergers
 On March 1, 2005 - The town of Uchiura was merged with the former town of Noto and the village of Yanagida (both from Fugeshi District) to create the new town of Noto. Therefore, both districts were merged to create Hōsu District and were dissolved.

See also
 List of dissolved districts of Japan

Former districts of Ishikawa Prefecture